Rainbow Stage is a not-for-profit musical theatre company and outdoor theatre operator, located in Kildonan Park in north Winnipeg, Manitoba. The covered amphitheatre seats up to 2,600 people and operates from May to September.

History
As urban parks became more popular in the 1910s, various public events began to be held in Winnipeg's Kildonan Park and Assiniboine Parks, leading to the creation of a permanent bandstand in Kildonan Park in 1917.

The Kildonan Park Bandstand was for years a popular venue for live music, dance contests, and large-scale community sing-a-longs hosted by The Winnipeg Tribune newspaper, called "Nights of Community Song", at the height of the Depression era. In 1950, however, the severe Red River flood left the bandstand destroyed, as it did thousands of other Manitoban buildings and homes. Following the flood, there was common consensus that the bandstand ought to be replaced, as bandstands were no longer a much popular attraction, and music tastes had drastically shifted.

Looking to Vancouver's Theatre Under the Stars at Stanley Park as its exemplar, the Winnipeg Junior Chamber of Commerce and the Civic Music League proposed a sound stage to be built, which could serve as both a venue for local talents as well as a new tourist attraction in Winnipeg. The Civic Music League led the fundraising campaign for the construction of the new stage, and involved radio contests, a limerick competition, and canvassing at local businesses. Public fundraising ultimately brought in $15,000, with another $15,000 being offered by the Winnipeg government.

The 3,000-seat theatre was designed by architects Smith, Carter, Katelnikoff. The new theatre received its named after architect Dennis Carter brought a cardboard model of the design with him to a meeting one night, and someone had observed that if lights were strung along the top curvature, "it would look like a rainbow."

Construction began in 1951 and was completed in the spring of 1952, with additional work on the amphitheatre being completed in 1953. Though some construction was still needing to be done, the Rainbow Stage saw its first concert  on 22 September 1953, performed by the touring Kitsilano Boys Band from Vancouver. Between 1953 and 1954, pergola walkways were constructed on either side of the amphitheatre.

On 7 July 1954, the Rainbow Stage was officially opened, featuring a benefit concert with Bill Walker as the night's MC. Performing first was the Ukrainian Youth Association, followed by the James Duncan chorus who performed songs from the musical Carousel; other performers included Walker himself with Len Adree, as well as Eric Wild and his CBC Orchestra, and the Jewish Community Choir with Cantor Benjamin Brownstown.

In its opening year, the stage saw 19 performances to a combined audience of more than 19,000. The first full-length musical to be presented was Brigadoon, in the fall of 1955.
The Winnipeg Summer Theatre Association was founded in 1956 to administer the theatre. A decade later, in 1966, the non-profit organization Rainbow Stage Inc was chartered, with Jack Shapira as executive producer.

In 1970, a triodetic dome, using 63 tons of steel and costing $175,000, was constructed over the theatre by the Dominion Bridge Company. Further renovations were completed in 1975, which resulted in a modernized facility but a reduction of 600 seats. The renovations involved a labour dispute and a temporary move to the Manitoba Centennial Concert Hall. In 1986, a fly gallery, carpentry and paint shops, classrooms and expanded change rooms were added to the facility. The 1986 renovation involved replacing an original timber arch. A commemorative plaque and a replica of the arch were erected in front of the building in 1988.

Jack Shapira was maintained as executive producer of Rainbow Stage Inc. until he was forced to resign in 1988 as a result of financial improprieties. Jerrett Enns became general manager in 1991.

The first original production at Rainbow Stage came in 1990 with the musical review Say It With Music. The performance featured songs from various musicals.

In 2011, the building's exterior was painted in an extensive mural by local artists Mandy Van Leeuwen and Michel Saint Hilaire. Painting began June 1 and the finished murals were unveiled in August.

In 2012, the theatre appointed Ray Hogg as artistic director and promoted Julie Eccles to executive director. After a successful and critically acclaimed 2013 season, 2014 saw the summer playbill feature three shows for the first time in over 30 years.

In Fall of 2017 Hogg resigned as Artist Director of Rainbow Stage. After an extensive search process Rainbow Stage then appointed local Manitoba artist Carson Nattrass as artistic director in November 2017.

Productions

Rainbow Stage has presented the following shows in its history:

1950s
1955 - Brigadoon
1956 - The Wizard of Oz, Annie Get Your Gun, Our Town, Kiss Me, Kate
1957 - Can-Can, Pitfalls of Pauline, Do You Remember, I Remember Mama, Gentlemen Prefer Blondes, Chu Chin Chow, Pot O'Gold Variety Show
1958 - The King and I, Hell's A' Poppin', Brigadoon
1959 - Guys and Dolls, Show Boat, The Wizard of Oz

1960s
1960 - The Pajama Game, Damn Yankees!, Carousel
1961 - South Pacific, High Button Shoes, The Most Happy Fella
1962 - The Music Man, The Student Prince, Oklahoma!
1963 - West Side Story, The King and I, Bye, Bye Birdie
1964 - The Sound of Music, Anything Goes, Finian's Rainbow, Gypsy: A Musical Fable
1965 - Flower Drum Song, Can-Can, Guys and Dolls, Annie Get Your Gun
1966 - My Fair Lady, South Pacific
1967 - Oliver!, The Sound of Music
1968 - Carnival!, The Music Man
1969 - The King and I, Funny Girl

1970s
1970 - The Wizard of Oz, Hello, Dolly!
1971 - Peter Pan, Fiddler on the Roof
1972 - Cinderella, Mame
1973 - Where's Charley?, Annie Get Your Gun
1974 - The Sound of Music, No, No, Nanette
1975 - My Fair Lady
1976 - Oklahoma!, Brigadoon
1977 - Irene, Fiddler on the Roof
1978 - Oliver!, Hello, Dolly!
1979 - The King and I, The Desert Song

1980s
1980 - Guys and Dolls, Show Boat
1981 - South Pacific, Funny Girl
1982 - The Pajama Game, The Music Man
1983 - The Pirates of Penzance, Kiss Me, Kate
1984 - Kismet, Fiddler on the Roof
1985 - H.M.S. Pinafore, Mame
1986 - The Student Prince, The Sound of Music
1987 - My Fair Lady, Annie, Anne of Green Gables - The Musical
1988 - Oliver!, Sweet Charity
1989 - Carousel, Peter Pan

1990s
1990 - Anything Goes, Say It with Music, Cinderella
1991 - A Funny Thing Happened on the Way to the Forum, The Wizard of Oz
1992 - The Wizard of Oz, Guys and Dolls
1993 - Fiddler on the Roof
1994 - Brigadoon, Damn Yankees!
1995 - Oklahoma!
1996 - The Sound of Music
1997 - South Pacific
1998 - The Music Man
1999 - Crazy For You

2000s

2000 - Singin' in the Rain, 42nd Street
2001 - A Chorus Line, Big: The Musical
2002 - Fame, West Side Story
2003 - Footloose, Joseph and the Amazing Technicolor Dreamcoat
2004 - Chicago, The King and I, Beauty and the Beast
2005 - Miss Saigon, Good News, Smokey Joe's Cafe
2006 - The Wizard of Oz
2007 - Grease, The Sound of Music
2008 - The Full Monty, Peter Pan, Forever Plaid
2009 - Beauty and the Beast

2010s
2010 - Rent, Joseph and the Amazing Technicolor Dreamcoat
2011 - Cats, Hairspray
2012 - Footloose, Annie
2013 - Buddy - The Buddy Holly Story, Mary Poppins
2014 - A Closer Walk With Patsy Cline, The Producers, The Little Mermaid
2015 - West Side Story, Les Misérables, Sister Act
2016 - Ring Of Fire, Shrek The Musical
2017 - Little Shop of Horrors, Mamma Mia!
2018 - Breaking Up Is Hard To Do, Beauty and the Beast
2019 - Guys and Dolls, Strike! the Musical, Rodgers and Hammerstein's Cinderella

2020s
2022 - The Hockey Sweater, The Wizard of Oz
2023 - Rent, The Little Mermaid

Full-length musicals
The first full-length musical to be presented at Rainbow Stage was Brigadoon, in the fall of 1955. Since then most of the productions have been of Broadway musicals including: Annie Get Your Gun (1956, 1965, 1973), Kiss Me, Kate (1956, 1983), The King and I (1958, 1963, 1969, 1979, 2004), Guys and Dolls (1959, 1965, 1980, 1992, 2019), Damn Yankees (1960, 1994), The Music Man (1962, 1968, 1982, 1998), My Fair Lady (1966, 1975, 1987), The Sound of Music (1964, 1967, 1974, 1986, 1996, 2007), Carousel (1960, 1989), Cinderella (1972, 1990, 2019) and Anything Goes (1964, 1990). In 1990, Rainbow Stage presented its first original production, the musical review Say It With Music, "put together by Manitobans for Manitobans" featuring songs from The Wizard of Oz, The Music Man, Kismet, Gypsy, West Side Story, Fiddler on the Roof, and other musicals.

Company
The company, officially Rainbow Stage Inc., is a registered charitable organization. Formed on April 30, 1993, it is governed by a board of directors and managed by 7 full-time staff.

Rainbow Stage features Canadian actors, musicians and production team members, many of whom are hired locally. Stars for some productions include the directors John Hirsch and Peggy Jarman Green; the conductors Filmer Hubble and Eric Wild; the singing actors Evelyne Anderson, Len Cariou, Ed Evanko, Cliff Gardiner, Morley Meredith, and Bill Walker; the chorus director James Duncan; and the Royal Winnipeg Ballet artistic director Arnold Spohr. Other Canadian performers at Rainbow Stage have included Jan Rubeš, Roma Hearn, Catherine McKinnon, and Wally Koster. The 2011 production of Hairspray featured American actor George Wendt in the role of Edna Turnblad.

In 2018, Rainbow Stage made a revenue of CA$2.8 million—2% coming from sponsorships, 3% from government (municipal, provincial, and federal), 8% from donations and fundraising, and the rest from earned income (i.e., ticket sales, concessions, souvenirs).

, sponsors of Rainbow Stage include:

 Prolific Group
 Assiniboine Credit Union
 Gerry & Barb Price
 Thompson Dorfman Sweatman LLP
 KISS 102.3
 Richardson Foundation
 Canada Life
 The Winnipeg Foundation
 Empire Iron Works
 Winnipeg Arts Council
 Independent Jewellers Ltd. (IJL)
 CJNU 93.7
 Garden City
 Payworks
 The Asper Foundation
 Microsoft
 Manitoba Liquor & Lotteries
 Government of Canada
 Bell Let's Talk
 Gail Asper Family Foundation
 Manitoba Sport, Culture and Heritage
 Wawanesa Insurance
 CAA Manitoba
 Christie Lites
 Casinos of Winnipeg

References

External links
Official website

1954 establishments in Manitoba
Music venues in Winnipeg
Theatres in Winnipeg
Theatre companies in Manitoba
Tourist attractions in Winnipeg